A Moor's head, since the 11th century, is a symbol depicting the head of a black moor.

Origin

The precise origin of the Moor's head is a subject of controversy.  But the most likely explanation is that it is derived from the heraldic war flag of the Reconquista depicting the Cross of Alcoraz, symbolizing Peter I of Aragon and Pamplona's victory over the "Moorish" kings of the Taifa of Zaragoza in the Battle of Alcoraz in 1096. The blindfold may originally have been a headband.

Another theory claims that it is the Nubian Saint Maurice (3rd century AD).

The earliest heraldic use of the Moor's head is first recorded in 1281, during the reign of Peter III of Aragon and represents the Cross of Alcoraz, which the King adopted as his personal coat of arms. The Crown of Aragon had for a long time governed Sardinia and Corsica, having been granted the islands by the Pope, although they never really exercised formal control. The Moor's head became a symbol of the islands.

Flags, seals, and emblems 
This symbol is used in heraldry, vexillography, and political imagery.

Flag of Corsica 
An early version is attested in the 14th-century Gelre Armorial, where an unblindfolded Moor's head represents Corsica as a state of the Crown of Aragon. Interestingly, the Moor's head is attached to his shoulders and upper body, and he is alive and smiling. In 1736, it was used by both sides during the struggle for independence.

In 1760, General Pasquale Paoli ordered the necklace to be removed from the head and the blindfold raised.  His reason, reported by his biographers, was "" The blindfold was thereafter changed to a headband.

Flag of Sardinia 
The flag of Sardinia is informally known as the Four Moors and comprises four Moor heads.

African Unification Front 
The "Maure" is the African Unification Front's flag and emblem. The head is blindfolded representing the impartiality of justice, and the knot is tied into a stylized Adinkra symbol for omnipotence (Gye Nyame).

Modern controversy

Modern anti-racism efforts, coupled with increased African immigration to Europe and a growth of the Afro-European population, have led to controversies around ancient "Moor's head" symbols. For example, the Austrian company Mohrenbrauerei was asked to remove the "Moor's head" from its bottles.

Gallery

See also 
 Blackamoor (decorative arts)
 Heads in heraldry
 Turk head (heraldry)
 Cross of Alcoraz

References

Further reading
 
 
 
  which in turn cites

External links
 

Heraldic charges
Symbols
Black symbols
Black people in art